Dhurbe is a wild male elephant in Chitwan National Park of Nepal that killed 16 people and destroyed more than 50 houses in a span of four years from 2009 ato 2012. Contact with the elephant was lost in 2013 but it has subsequently reappeared from time-to-time. The elephant is named after a soldier who it killed. 

After the initial attacks, the elephant was radio-collared to track its movements, but the radio stopped working after a few weeks. When the elephant killed more people in 2012 officials declared it as a mad elephant and decided to hunt and kill it. 93 soliders from the Nepal Army and Chitwan National Parks were mobilized to kill the elephant but they could not locate it. Later, the officials claimed that Dhurbe was injured but ran away and survived.

Dhurbe next appeared in 2018. It broke into the army post of Chitwan National Park at Tirthamankali and took a female elephant with him. At the same time, Dhurbe attacked and injured a male elephant named Paras Gaj. In 2020, Dhurbe was radio collared again to track its movement. In April 2021, Dhurbe attacked a survey team who were counting rhinos. In October 2021, he appeared again accompanied by a female elephant.

See also
 List of individual elephants

References

Elephants in Nepal
Elephant attacks
Individual elephants
Individual animals in Nepal
Individual wild animals